Phoebe Bell (born ) is an Australian female volleyball and beach volleyball player.

She participated in the 2015 FIVB Volleyball World Grand Prix. At club level she played for Queensland Pirates in 2015. That year Bell also played one season of indoor volleyball during her first year at Boise State University.

References

External links

1996 births
Living people
Australian expatriate sportspeople in the United States
Australian expatriate volleyball players
Australian women's beach volleyball players
Australian women's volleyball players
Place of birth missing (living people)
Beach volleyball players at the 2014 Summer Youth Olympics
Boise State Broncos athletes
College women's volleyball players in the United States
Sportspeople from Brisbane
Sportswomen from Queensland